James Browne (October 3, 1930 – April 23, 2003) was an American professional basketball player. He played for the Chicago Stags (1948–49) and Denver Nuggets (1949–50) in the BAA and NBA for 35 games.

BAA/NBA career statistics

Regular season

References

External links

1930 births
2003 deaths
American men's basketball players
Basketball players from Illinois
Chicago Stags players
Denver Nuggets (1948–1950) players
Sportspeople from Cook County, Illinois
People from Midlothian, Illinois
Centers (basketball)
Basketball players from Chicago